Boglárka Dévai (born 12 November 1999) is a Hungarian female artistic gymnast. She is the 2018 European champion and 2017 European bronze medalist on vault. She participated at the 2015 World Artistic Gymnastics Championships in Glasgow.

Dévai found international success when she won the bronze medal in the vault final at the 2017 European Artistic Gymnastics Championships behind Coline Devillard and Ellie Downie. She won the event at the 2018 European Artistic Gymnastics Championships ahead of Angelina Melnikova of Russia and Denisa Golgota of Romania after upgrading her Yurchenko half-on vault to a Cheng. In doing so, she became the first Hungarian female gymnast to win a gold medal at the European Championships since Adrienn Varga also won vault in 1998.

References

External links
https://thegymter.net/boglarka-devai/
http://sportmonitor.info/?p=3424
https://database.fig-gymnastics.com/public/gymnasts/biography/22888/true?backUrl=%2Fpublic%2Fresults%2Fdisplay%2F12100%3FidAgeCategory%3D4%26idCategory%3D68%23anchor_30754
http://wats-good-gabby.tumblr.com/post/95067795423/love-from-hungarys-boglarka-devai
http://vaskarika.hu/hirek/reszletek/12299/vermes_remenyekkel_a_finale_elott-devai_boglarka_es_berki_kriszt/
http://www.utanpotlassport.hu/tag/devai-boglarka/
http://www.nemzetisport.hu/egyeb_egyeni/torna-vk-devai-boglarka-ezustermes-lett-ugrasban-2439135

1999 births
Living people
Hungarian female artistic gymnasts
European champions in gymnastics
Gymnasts at the 2014 Summer Youth Olympics
Sportspeople from Szombathely
20th-century Hungarian women
21st-century Hungarian women